Juan Pablo Romero may refer to:

 Juan Pablo Romero (boxer), Mexican boxer
 Juan Pablo Romero (footballer), Argentine footballer